Dead as Dreams is the only studio album by Weakling. It was recorded in 1998 and released in 2000, through the tUMULt record label, while the band itself ceased activity in 1999. The title of the album comes from a line in the movie Legend.

Release 

Dead as Dreams was initially released on cassette, double-vinyl and CD. The tape version was limited to 300 copies.

Track listing CD version 

 Note: The LP version has the tracks in a different order; "No One Can Be Called as a Man While He'll Die" comes before all the other tracks.
 Note: The spelling of "Desasters in the Sun" is a reference to the Destruction song "Total Desaster" from their debut release Sentence of Death.

Personnel 

 John Gossard – guitar, vocals
 Casey Ward – keyboards
 Little Sunshine (Sam) – drums
 Sara Weiner – bass guitar
 Joshua M. Smith – guitar

References 

2000 debut albums
Weakling albums